Finland competed at the 1992 Winter Paralympics in Tignes/Albertville, France. 17 competitors from Finland won 14 medals including 7 gold, 3 silver and 4 bronze and finished 5th in the medal table.

See also 
 Finland at the Paralympics
 Finland at the 1992 Winter Olympics

References 

1992
1992 in Finnish sport
Nations at the 1992 Winter Paralympics